Dicymolomia grisea is a moth in the family Crambidae. It is found in North America, where it has been recorded from southern Texas to Florida and South Carolina.

Adults are on wing from January to August and from October to December in Florida and from March to June and in November in Texas.

References

Moths described in 1964
Glaphyriinae